Jennifer Leigh Hooker (born June 6, 1961), also known by her married name Jennifer Brinegar, is an American former competition swimmer who represented the United States at the 1976 Summer Olympics in Montreal, Quebec.  She competed in the women's 200-meter freestyle, and finished sixth in the final with a time of 2:04.20.  She also swam for the gold medal-winning U.S. team in the preliminary heats of the women's 4×100-meter freestyle relay, but did not receive a medal.  Under the Olympic swimming rules in effect in 1976, only those relay swimmers who competed in the event final were medal-eligible.

See also
 List of Indiana University (Bloomington) people

References

1961 births
Living people
American female freestyle swimmers
Indiana Hoosiers women's swimmers
Olympic swimmers of the United States
Sportspeople from Bloomington, Indiana
Swimmers at the 1976 Summer Olympics
Swimmers at the 1979 Pan American Games
Pan American Games silver medalists for the United States
Pan American Games medalists in swimming
Medalists at the 1979 Pan American Games